The National Archaeological Museum Aruba is an archaeological museum in the city of Oranjestad in Aruba. The collections covers from 2500 BCE to the 19th century.

In 1981, the Archaeological Museum of Aruba was opened. In 2009, the museum had moved to a new location and was reopened as the National Archaeological Museum Aruba.

See also 
 List of museums in Aruba

References

External links 
 
 

1981 establishments in Aruba
Archaeological museums
Museums established in 1981
Museums in Aruba
Monuments of Aruba
Buildings and structures in Oranjestad, Aruba
20th-century architecture in the Netherlands